Somdev Devvarman was the defending champion and successfully defended his title, defeating Yuki Bhambri in the final, 3–6, 6–4, 6–0.

Seeds

Draw

Finals

Top half

Bottom half

External links
 Main Draw
 Qualifying Draw

Delhi Open - Singles